The 2013 Ole Miss Rebels football team represented the University of Mississippi in the 2013 NCAA Division I FBS football season. The team was coached by Hugh Freeze, who was in his second season with Ole Miss. The Rebels played their home games at Vaught–Hemingway Stadium in Oxford, Mississippi, and competed in the Western Division of the Southeastern Conference (SEC).

On February 11, 2019, Ole Miss announced the vacation of all wins in the years 2010, 2011, 2012, and 2016. In 2013, all wins except the Music City Bowl were vacated. In 2014, all wins except the Presbyterian game were vacated.

Personnel

Coaching staff

Schedule 
Ole Miss traveled to SEC opponents Vanderbilt, Auburn, Alabama, and ended the season on the road against Mississippi State. The Rebels played host to Texas A&M, Arkansas, LSU and Missouri. Ole Miss also traveled to Power 5 foe Texas.

Schedule Source:

*- The game is being produced by Longhorn Network. The following stations will broadcast the game live throughout the Ole Miss broadcasting region.
 WREG (Memphis)
 WFGX (Mobile/Pensacola)
 WJTV (Jackson)
 WCBI (Columbus-Tupelo)
 WXXV (Biloxi-Gulfport)
 WHLT (Hattiesburg-Laurel)
 WMDN (Meridian)
 WABG (Greenwood-Greenville)

Game summaries

Vanderbilt

SE Missouri State

Texas

Alabama

Auburn

Texas A&M

LSU

Idaho

Arkansas

Troy

Missouri

at Mississippi State

Georgia Tech

Rankings

References 

Ole Miss
Ole Miss Rebels football seasons
Music City Bowl champion seasons
Ole Miss Rebels football